Kalypso Aude Nicolaïdis is a Franco-Greek academic, currently Professor of International Relations and Director of the Center for International Studies at Oxford University, England. She teaches in the areas of European integration, international relations, international political economy, negotiation and game theory and research methods as University Lecturer in the Department of Politics and International Relations. In 2020, Nicolaïdis joined the School of Transnational Governance at the European University Institute as a full time professor.

Biography
Nicolaïdis holds a Ph.D. in Political Economy and Government from Harvard University, a Master in Public Administration from the Kennedy School of Government, a Master in International Economics and a Diplôme Service Public from the Institut d'études politiques in Paris. She also studied law and philosophy at the Paris I-Sorbonne. She is of French and Greek nationality with German and Spanish origins. Her husband, Simon Saunders, is British and teaches Philosophy of Science at Oxford University. Her two children, Ari and Daphne, are trans-channel Europeans.

She moved to Massachusetts to study international relations at Harvard University in 1983, where she became associate professor at the Kennedy School of Government and later moved back to Europe. She has also held visiting professorships around Europe, including at the École nationale d'administration in Paris, at the College of Europe in Bruges as the professorial chair on Visions of Europe and in Sciences-Po, Paris as Vincent Wright chair. In 2012–2013, She was Emile Noel-Straus Senior Fellow at NYU Law School (2012–2013).

At Harvard, she was the founder and chair of the Kokkalis Programme on Southeast Europe before moving on to create and Chair  the South East European Studies at Oxford (SEESOX). At Oxford, she also chairs the RENEW programme (Rethinking Europe in a Non European World), the Euro-Mediterranean network RAMSES, coordinated by the Maison Méditerranéenne des Sciences de l'Homme in Aix en Provence, and the EU-WTO Oxford programme in collaboration with the German Marshall Fund.

Nicolaïdis has been involved in policy for some time. She is a Council member of the European Council of Foreign Relations. From 1996 to 2004, she advised prominent Greek politician, George Papandreou on European affairs during his first term as Foreign Minister of Greece. Separately, she chaired the International Group of Expert Advisors on the Convention on the Future of Europe. She was advisor to the 2004 Dutch Presidency of the Council of EU on the theme of "Europe: a Beautiful Idea", a policy-academia dialogue culminating in the December 2004 intellectual summit. Nicolaïdis has also worked with the European Commission on the White Paper on Governance (subsidiarity, global governance), on DG Trade and DG Communication consultations, as well as a trade and regulation expert for UNCTAD and the OECD. Most recently, she produced a report on the European Neighborhood Policy for the European Parliament.

Much of Nicolaïdis' recent work focuses on "European demoi-cracy" and the challenge of building an EU of deep diversity through the mutual recognition of identities, polities, and socio-economic rules. She has published widely on EU institutional and constitutional debates, EU external relations including with Mediterranean countries and the United States, issues of identity, justice and cooperation in the international system, the sources of legitimacy in European and global governance, the relationship between trade and regulation, trade in services as well as preventive diplomacy and dispute resolution.

Publications
Her articles have appeared in Foreign Affairs, Foreign Policy, The Journal of Common Market Studies, Journal of European Public Policy, International Organization as well as in French in Politique Étrangère, Politique Européenne and Raison Critique. As an editor, her books include Echoes of Empire: Memory, Identity and Colonial Legacies (ed w/ Sebe and Maas, IB Tauris), Normative Power Europe Revisited (ed w/ Whitman, Journal Conflict and Cooperation) and European Stories: Intellectual Debates on Europe in National Context (ed w/ Lacroix, OUP, 2010).

External links
 European Studies Centre
 Nicolaidis' home page

Living people
Fellows of St Antony's College, Oxford
Harvard Kennedy School faculty
Academic staff of the College of Europe
University of Paris alumni
Harvard Kennedy School alumni
European Union and European integration scholars
1962 births